Henk Booysen (born 1 November 1972) is a retired South African shot putter and javelin thrower.

In the shot put he won the gold medal at the 1995 All-Africa Games and the 1996 African Championships. In the javelin throw he finished fourth at the 1995 All-Africa Games.

His personal best put was 19.34 metres, achieved in April 1995 in Pietersburg.

References

External links
 

1972 births
Living people
South African male shot putters
South African male javelin throwers
African Games gold medalists for South Africa
Athletes (track and field) at the 1995 All-Africa Games
African Games medalists in athletics (track and field)